Stubenberg may refer to:

Locations
 Stubenberg, Bavaria
 Stubenberg, Styria

Other
 Stubenberg (family)
Maria Anna Stubenberg (1821-1912), composer